A modern  core drill is a drill specifically designed to remove a cylinder of material, much like a hole saw. The material left inside the drill bit is referred to as the core.

Core drills used in metal are called annular cutters.  Core drills used for concrete and hard rock generally use industrial diamond grit as the abrasive material and may be electrical, pneumatic or hydraulic powered.  Core drills are commonly water cooled, and the water also carries away the fine waste as a slurry.  For drilling masonry, carbide core drills can be used, but diamond is more successful when cutting through rebar.

The earliest core drills were those used by the ancient Egyptians, invented in 3000 BC. Core drills are used for many applications, either where the core needs to be preserved (the drilling apparatus used in obtaining a core sample is often referred to as a corer), or where drilling can be done more rapidly since much less material needs to be removed than with a standard bit.  This is the reason that diamond-tipped core drills are commonly used in construction to create holes for pipes, manholes, and other large-diameter penetrations in concrete or stone.

Core drills are used frequently in mineral exploration where the coring may be several hundred to several thousand feet in length.  The core samples are recovered and examined by geologists for mineral percentages and stratigraphic contact points.  This gives exploration companies the information necessary to begin or abandon mining operations in a particular area.

Before the start of World War Two, Branner Newsom, a California mining engineer, invented a core drill that could take out large diameter cores up to 16 feet in length for mining shafts.  This type of core drill is no longer in use as modern drill technology allows standard drilling to accomplish the same at a much cheaper cost.

Core drills come with several power choices including electric, pneumatic, and hydraulic (all of which require power sources, such as a generator).

Wireline core drilling
Wireline core drilling is a technique used to extract the core without having to retrieve the entire drill tube, which generally only needs to be retracted when the hole is finished or the tip must be replaced. Drill tube extensions are added at the top as required to extend the tube as the hole gets deeper. The core sample is carried by an inner tube locked in place in contact with the drilling head, To recover the core, the drive system is disconnected, opening the top of the tube. A tool called the overshot assembly is lowered at the end of a wire using the retraction winch, when it reached the sample tube, it locks onto the top, and applying tension to the wire unlocks the sample tube from the drill head and retracts it and the core sample to the open top end of the drill tube, where it can be removed before returning the sample tube down the drill tube to lock back onto to the cutting head. This is particularly useful if there is a high risk of the hole walls collapsing when the drill tube is retracted, so it is suitable for most soil types, and to depths of 1000 m. Several diameters are available.

See also
Core drills (annular cutters for metal drilling)
Drilling fluid
Drilling rig
Exploration diamond drilling

References

Drilling technology
Ancient Egyptian technology
Egyptian inventions
In situ geotechnical investigations